Eta Ophiuchi (η Ophiuchi, abbreviated Eta Oph, η Oph) is a binary star in the constellation of Ophiuchus. Based on parallax measurements taken during the Hipparcos mission, it is approximately 88 light-years from the Sun.

Eta Ophiuchi is part of a multiple star system designated WDS J17104-1544. It itself is designated WDS J17104-1544AB and its two components WDS J17104-1544A (also called Sabik , the traditional name for the system) and WDS J17104-1544B. The 'C' component is UCAC4 372-080717 and 'D' is UCAC2 26022336.

Nomenclature
η Ophiuchi (Latinised to Eta Ophiuchi) is the system's Bayer designation. WDS J17104-1544AB is its designation in the Washington Double Star Catalog. The designations of the two components as WDS J17104-1544 A and B derive from the convention used by the Washington Multiplicity Catalog (WMC) for multiple star systems, and adopted by the International Astronomical Union (IAU).

It bore the traditional name Sabik, from the Arabic السابق al-sābiq "the  preceding one", of uncertain reference. In 2016, the International Astronomical Union organized a Working Group on Star Names (WGSN) to catalogue and standardize proper names for stars. The WGSN approved the name Sabik for the component WDS J17104-1544 A on 21 August 2016 and it is now so included in the List of IAU-approved Star Names.

Namesake
USS Sabik (AK-121) was a United States Navy Crater class cargo ship named after the star.

Properties
Eta Ophiuchi is a binary system that is difficult to resolve in amateur telescopes but whose true nature was determined through use of more advanced techniques. The primary star (whose observational data make up the table in this article) is actually only slightly larger and hotter than its companion. Individually each star is a fairly unremarkable A class main sequence star, but as a binary pair they are unusual. Each star orbits around a common center in a close and highly elliptical orbit, making planetary formation unlikely in this system and some stellar data imprecise.

References

Ophiuchi, Eta
Binary stars
Ophiuchi, 35
155125
084012
Ophiuchus (constellation)
A-type subgiants
6378
Durchmusterung objects
0656.1